Gail Suzanne Jones (born November 1977) is a British businesswoman and entrepreneur. She is co-founder and former CEO of the Manchester-based colocation, dedicated and cloud hosting provider, UKFast.

Biography 
As a child, Jones attended Altrincham School for Girls. In 1999, she formed UKFast with her partner Lawrence Jones. The hosting and colocation business operates a data centre complex in Trafford Park, Manchester, and has more 300 employees. In 2018, the firm's turnover was £53.9 million and the company was valued at £405million. In 2017 she became the Managing Director, and in 2019, she took over the CEO role.

The same year, Jones and husband Lawrence sold a 30% stake in the business to private equity firm Inflexion.

She exited the business in 2020.

She has overseen investments in various businesses, including in public sector tech company S-IA in 2017. Jones and her husband acquired Le Farinet Hotel in Swiss ski resort Verbier in September 2014. Jones is also a director for cybersecurity firm Secarma, magazine and events creator BusinessCloud and UKFast Properties.

In 2017, Jones joined the board of not-for-profit organisation Tech Manchester. Jones also sits on the board of Manchester Foundation Trust Charity, which includes Royal Manchester Children's Hospital Charity. Jones launched the UKFast Community and Education Awards in 2018, and signed the Tech Talent Charter and the Manchester Pride 'All Equals Charter' on behalf of UKFast to drive diversity and inclusion in the technology industry.

Jones is a keen advocate of women in business and technology and often speaks at industry events and works with local schools to redress the gender imbalance in the technology industry. She maintains a relationship with Altrincham School for Girls, speaking at workshops and welcoming students to UKFast. Jones also invited pupils from the school to meet HRH Princess Royal while the Princess Royal visited UKFast. She drove UKFast's CSR efforts and she and husband Lawrence donated £5 million to a dedicated trust following the Inflexion deal in 2018.

Jones created an ethos at UKFast that is centred on family - boosting the maternity package and reducing working hours to help create a stronger work-life balance for employees. She is active in the business community, working with awards organisations to recognise and reward others' success. In 2019, Jones was a judge for the National Business Awards and the Northern Power Women Awards.

Honours and awards 
In 2018, Jones was awarded the ICCC Caring Citizen of the Humanities Award.

She was named in the Northern Power Women List in 2016 and 2019. She was also listed in the 2018 and 2019 Most Influential Women in Tech List collated by Computer Weekly.

Political activity
Jones donated £100,000 to the Conservative Party in September 2019.

Personal life 
Gail and Lawrence Jones have four daughters. They live in Cheshire, England.

References 

1977 births
Living people
21st-century British businesspeople
British women chief executives
British women company founders
20th-century British businesspeople
Conservative Party (UK) donors